Blood Bound may refer to:
 Bloodbound, a Swedish power metal band
 "Blood Bound" (song), a song by HammerFall